Kostadin Dyakov (born 22 August 1985) is a Bulgarian former footballer who played as a midfielder.

Career 
He was raised in Levski Sofia's youth teams. After that he played as a loaned footballer for Vihren Sandanski and Rodopa Smolyan. He signed than with Chernomorets Burgas in June 2007 on free transfer from Levski Sofia and joined on 8 October 2009 for a trial to FC Schalke 04.

On 14 July 2016, Dyakov signed with Montana. He left the club in June 2017 when his contract expired.

On 5 September 2017, Dyakov signed with Second League club Maritsa Plovdiv.

Position 
Dyakov plays as a right or defensive midfielder.

References 

1985 births
Living people
Footballers from Plovdiv
Bulgarian footballers
First Professional Football League (Bulgaria) players
Second Professional Football League (Bulgaria) players
PFC Levski Sofia players
OFC Vihren Sandanski players
PFC Rodopa Smolyan players
PFC Chernomorets Burgas players
Botev Plovdiv players
PFC Slavia Sofia players
OFC Pirin Blagoevgrad players
FC Montana players
FC Maritsa Plovdiv players
FC Oborishte players
Association football midfielders